Carles Campuzano i Canadès (born 12 July 1964) is a Catalan politician and a former member of the Congress of Deputies of Spain and the Parliament of Catalonia.

Early life and family
Campuzano was born on 12 July 1964 in Barcelona, Catalonia. He has a degree in law from the University of Barcelona. Campuzano joined the Nationalist Youth of Catalonia (JNC) in 1981 and was a member of its National Executive Committee from 1984 as well as its secretary-general (1989–94) and president (1994-96). He was one of the founders of the National Student Federation of Catalonia (Federació Nacional d'Estudiants de Catalunya, FNEC). Campuzano joined the Democratic Convergence of Catalonia (CDC) in 1983 and was a member its national council.

Career

Campuzano worked as technical assistant in the Generalitat de Catalunya's Department of Presidency between 1986 and 1992.

Campuzano was a member of Vilanova i la Geltrú Municipal Council from 1987 to 1991 and Garraf County Council from 1991 to 1992. He contested the 1992 regional election as a Convergence and Union (CiU) electoral alliance candidate in the Province of Barcelona and was elected to the Parliament of Catalonia. Campuzano did not contest the 1995 regional election but was nominated as the CiU's number one substitute candidate in the Province of Barcelona.

Campuzano contested the 1996 general election as a CiU candidate in the Province of Barcelona and was elected to the Congress of Deputies. He was re-elected at the 2000, 2004, 2008, 2011, 2015 and 2016 general elections. Campuzano has been spokesperson for the Catalan European Democratic Party (PDeCAT) in the Congress of Deputies since April 2017 and was a member of the Spanish delegation in the Parliamentary Assembly of the Organization for Security and Cooperation in Europe (OSCE). Despite having been proposed by its party to be the main candidate of Together for Catalonia to seek the April 2019 Spanish general election, he wouldn't be chosen in the end, being replaced by Laura Borràs as the main candidate by Barcelona. Eventually, Carles Campuzano announced that he would be leaving the PDeCAT because of differences on its political ideology and project.

Campuzano is chairman of the Associació Catalana de Solidaritat i Ajuda als Refugiats (Catalan Association of Solidarity and Refugee Aid, ACSAR Foundation) and a member of Òmnium Cultural, Greenpeace and Obra Cultural Balear de Mallorca.

Electoral history

References

1964 births
Catalan European Democratic Party politicians
Convergence and Union politicians
Democratic Convergence of Catalonia politicians
Living people
Members of the 6th Congress of Deputies (Spain)
Members of the 7th Congress of Deputies (Spain)
Members of the 8th Congress of Deputies (Spain)
Members of the 9th Congress of Deputies (Spain)
Members of the 10th Congress of Deputies (Spain)
Members of the 11th Congress of Deputies (Spain)
Members of the 12th Congress of Deputies (Spain)
Members of the 4th Parliament of Catalonia
Municipal councillors in the province of Barcelona
People from Vilanova i la Geltrú
University of Barcelona alumni